The Irish League in season 1971–72 comprised 12 teams, and Glentoran won the championship.

League standings

Results

References
Northern Ireland - List of final tables (RSSSF)

NIFL Premiership seasons
1971–72 in Northern Ireland association football
North